Cleopatra Was Candida (Spanish:Cleopatra era Cándida) is a 1964 Argentine comedy film directed by Julio Saraceni and starring Niní Marshall, Juan Verdaguer and Tito Lusiardo.

Cast
 Niní Marshall as Cleopatra García Pérez  Cándida  
 Juan Verdaguer as Florencio Ferrari  
 Tito Lusiardo as Valentín a.k.a. Dr. Arévalo  
 Amelia Vargas as Berta  
 Johnny Tedesco as Johnny 
 Estela Molly as Catalina  
 Vicente Rubino as Distéfano 
 Tristan as Fermín 
 Mario Savino 
 Orestes Soriani 
 Susana Ferrer 
 Otto Weber 
 Héctor Fuentes
 Ego Brunoldi 
 Juan Carlos Cevallos
 Jesús Pampín

References

Bibliography 
 Plazaola, Luis Trelles. South American Cinema. La Editorial, UPR, 1989.

External links 
 

1964 films
Argentine comedy films
1964 comedy films
1960s Spanish-language films
Films directed by Julio Saraceni
Films with screenplays by Abel Santa Cruz
1960s Argentine films